Abdul Shafee (23 November 1925 – 26 April 2004) was an Indian politician. A member of the Indian National Congress, he served as a Member of Parliament in the 5th Lok Sabha. Shafee represented the Chandrapur constituency (formally known as Chanda). He was also a Member of Legislative Council of Maharashtra Vidhan Sabha, First Zilla Parishad President of Chandrapur, First Sarpanch of Rajoli. Shafee was a social activist and head of BSS (Bharat Sevak Samaj) before entering national politics.

Early life and education
Abdul Shafee was born in Bhandara, in the state of Maharashtra. He was an agriculturist and businessman before joining politics.

Political career
Abdul Shafee was active politics from the 1950s and joined Congress party. He was an MP for only one term. Shafee succeeded K. M. Koushik of Swatantra Party. After the 5th Lok Sabha, Chanda constituency ceased to exist and new constituency Chandrapur came into existence. Shafi's successor was Raje Vishveshvar Rao, who was a member of the Janata Party. Prior to entering the Lok Sabha, he was a member of the Gram Panchayat and Zila Parishad in various capacities.

Death
Shafee died in Rajoli, Maharashtra on 26 April 2004, at the age of 78.

Posts held

See also

5th Lok Sabha
Lok Sabha
Politics of India
Parliament of India
Government of India
Indian National Congress
Chandrapur

References 

1925 births
2004 deaths
India MPs 1971–1977
Indian National Congress politicians
Members of Parliament from Maharashtra
Lok Sabha members from Maharashtra
Maharashtra politicians
People from Chandrapur
People from Chandrapur district
People from Bhandara